Michael Courtney (5 February 1945 – 29 December 2003) was an Irish prelate of the Catholic Church. He entered the diplomatic service of the Holy See in 1980 and was given the rank of archbishop and named Apostolic Nuncio to Burundi in 2000.

He died of gunshot wounds suffered in a violent attack thought to be unrelated to Burundi's civil war. According to his brother, Courtney was the first papal nuncio to die as the result of violence in 500 years.

Biography
Michael Aidan Courtney was born in Summerhill, Nenagh, County Tipperary, the youngest of seven children born to Louis and Elizabeth Courtney. He attended Clongowes Wood College, Clonfert Seminary, studied for 1 year in University College Dublin before going to the Irish College in Rome. He was ordained a priest of the Diocese of Clonfert on 9 March 1968. He worked as a curate until 1973, then as chaplain to Tynagh mines while teaching at St Raphael's College, Loughrea, and then as a curate in Woodford. He returned to Rome in 1976 to earn a licentiate in canon law and a doctorate in moral theology and to prepare for a diplomat's career at the Pontifical Ecclesiastical Academy. In 1987 he was awarded an MA in legal philosophy at NUI, Galway.

He entered the diplomatic service of the Holy See on 25 March 1980, working at nunciatures in South Africa, Senegal, India, Yugoslavia, Cuba, and Egypt. He was named the Special Envoy and Permanent Observer to the Council of Europe in Strasbourg on 30 December 1995.

Pope John Paul II appointed him Apostolic Nuncio to Burundi and Titular Archbishop of Eanach Dúin on 18 August 2000. He received episcopal ordination on 12 November 2000 at St Mary of the Rosary Church in Nenagh from Cardinal Francis Arinze, Prefect of the Congregation for Divine Worship and the Discipline of the Sacraments, with Bishops John Kirby and William Walsh as co-consecrators.

Courtney was instrumental in the November 2003 signing of a peace agreement between the Burundian government and the main opposition Hutu group. He was anticipating a new assignment as nuncio to Cuba, where he had established a warm relationship with Fidel Castro.

Death and funeral
In December 2003, as Courtney was returning to Bujumbura from a funeral, gunmen fired at his car near Minago, 30 miles south of the capital. He suffered gunshot wounds to the head, shoulder and leg and died from hemorrhaging during surgery at The Prince Louis Rwagasore Hospital in Bujumbura. Archbishop Simon Ntamwana blamed the militant Hutu National Liberation Forces (FNL), but the FNL, which supported the November agreement, denied any responsibility and said Ntamwana should leave the country.

A crowd of 1500 attended a funeral Mass for Courtney in Burundi on 31 December. On 3 January 2004, Cardinals Arinze and Connell, Archbishop Seán Brady, Archbishop Giuseppe Lazzarotto, the Nuncio to Ireland, led a concelebrated funeral Mass in Nenagh. Minister for Defence Michael Smith represented the Government of Ireland at the Mass and burial.

Courtney was buried at Dromineer on the shores of Lough Derg, County Tipperary, near his native Nenagh.

References

1945 births
2003 deaths
Assassinated diplomats
Apostolic Nuncios to Burundi
Permanent Observers of the Holy See to the Council of Europe
Pontifical Ecclesiastical Academy alumni
21st-century Roman Catholic titular archbishops
People from County Tipperary
People murdered in Burundi
Irish murder victims
Deaths by firearm in Burundi
People of the Burundian Civil War
Bishops of Annaghdown
20th-century Irish Roman Catholic priests